The Confederation of the Polish Crown (KKP), often shorted to The Crown, is a far-right political party in Poland. It is led by Grzegorz Braun.

It has been described as nationalist and traditionalist, and the party advocates for monarchism. The party's goals are to "fight for the good of Poland, secure the sovereignty of the Polish State, defend Poland's Catholic faith, ensure that Polish families are prosperous, and help shape social life based on the principles of Latin civilization."

Since its formation, the party has been in a coalition with KORWiN and the National Movement called Confederation. Party leader Grzegorz Braun became the party's first member of the Sejm during the 2019 Polish parliamentary election.

Braun was a candidate in the 2020 Confederation presidential primary. He lost to Krzysztof Bosak during the final round of voting and then immediately endorsed his candidacy.

Braun has been described as a far-right politician, and an anti-vaccination activist.

Election results

Sejm

Presidential

References

2019 establishments in Poland
Catholic political parties
Catholicism and far-right politics
Conservative parties in Poland
Eurosceptic parties in Poland
Far-right political parties in Poland
Monarchism in Poland
Monarchist parties
Anti-Islam sentiment in Poland
Polish nationalist parties
Political parties established in 2019
Political parties in Poland
Reactionary
Confederation Liberty and Independence